The Richardson House, also known as the Captain George McManus House, is a historic house at 11 Lincoln Street in Brunswick, Maine.  Built in 1857, it is a fine local example of transitional Greek Revival-Italianate architecture in brick.  McManus, for whom it was built, was a prominent local ship's captain.  It was listed on the National Register of Historic Places in 1974.  For a time, it housed the museum of the Pejepscot Historical Society.

Description and history
The Richardson House stands on the south side of Lincoln Street, just west of the town's business district.  It is a two-story brick building, with a hip roof and a granite foundation.  The roof cornice is broad and studded with irregularly spaced Italianate brackets, with a line of dentil moulding. The street-facing facade is three bays wide, all windows, with the Colonial Revival entrance set in a projection to the left, under a flat-roofed porch supported by square paneled pillars.  The windows of the second floor are set in round-arch openings, with a shallow iron balcony extending across all three.

The house was built in 1857 for George McManus, a master mariner who lived here until his death in 1864.  It is one of the region's finest examples of transitional Greek Revival-Italianate design, but its architect is unknown.  In the mid-20th century it was owned by the locally prominent Richardson family, and it served for a number of years as the parsonage for St. Paul's Episcopal Church.  It thereafter housed the museum collection for the Pejepscot Historical Society for a time; its collections are now in the Skolfield-Whittier House.

See also
National Register of Historic Places listings in Cumberland County, Maine

References

Houses on the National Register of Historic Places in Maine
Greek Revival architecture in Maine
Italianate architecture in Maine
Houses completed in 1857
Houses in Brunswick, Maine
National Register of Historic Places in Cumberland County, Maine
Historic district contributing properties in Maine
1857 establishments in Maine